Second referendum may refer to:

 1995 Quebec referendum
 2005 Curaçao status referendum
 2006 South Ossetian independence referendum
 2017 Catalan independence referendum

See also
 Proposed referendum on the Brexit withdrawal agreement
 Proposed second Scottish independence referendum